Šime Žužul (born 10 January 1996) is a Croatian footballer currently playing as a forward for Lokomotiv Tashkent of the Uzbekistan Pro League.

Club career

Balestier Khalsa
Žužul signed for the Tigers for the 2019 Singapore Premier League. Žužul's first season in Singapore saw his team finish as the wooden spoonist of the league but on a personal level, it was a good one for the Croatian who scored 9 goals in 17 league game.

He played for 3 seasons with the tigers and scored a total of 31 goals in 52 matches.

Geylang International

He signed for the Eagles for the 2022 season, replacing Moresche who left for Central Coast Mariners.

Career statistics

Club

Notes

References

External links
 

1996 births
Living people
Footballers from Split, Croatia
Association football forwards
Croatian footballers
NK Imotski players
HNK Gorica players
NK Hrvatski Dragovoljac players
Balestier Khalsa FC players
Geylang International FC players
PFC Lokomotiv Tashkent players
First Football League (Croatia) players
Austrian Regionalliga players
Singapore Premier League players
Uzbekistan Pro League players
Croatian expatriate footballers
Croatian expatriate sportspeople in Slovenia
Expatriate footballers in Slovenia
Croatian expatriate sportspeople in Singapore
Expatriate footballers in Singapore
Expatriate footballers in Uzbekistan
Croatian expatriate sportspeople in Uzbekistan